A list of films produced by the Israeli film industry in 1989.

1989 releases

Unknown premiere date

Awards

See also
1989 in Israel

References

External links
 Israeli films of 1989 at the Internet Movie Database

Israeli
Film
1989